Kachhwa is a village in Gogunda Tehsil in Udaipur district in the Indian state of Rajasthan. The District headquarter of the village is Udaipur.

The postal head office of Kachhwa is Badgaon.

Geography
It is 39 kilometers away from the Udaipur district headquarters. It is located on 583 meters above Sea level.

References

Villages in Udaipur district